Bazargah (also Romanized as Bāzargāh and Bāzargā; also known as Bāzargān and Bāzār) is a village in Dastjerd Rural District, Alamut-e Gharbi District, Qazvin County, Qazvin Province, Iran. At the 2006 census, its population was 30, in 11 families.

References 

Populated places in Qazvin County